In astronomy, a fast blue optical transient (FBOT) is an explosion event similar to supernovas and Gamma-ray bursts which presents high optical luminosity between those but rises and decays faster and has its spectra concentrated on the blue range. It is caused by some very high-energy astrophysical process not yet understood but thought to be a type of supernova with events occurring at not more than 0.1% of the typical rate.

List

See also 
 Supernova
 Gamma-ray burst
 Intermediate luminosity optical transient

References

External links 
  (2016; Harvard University)

Astronomical events
Radio astronomy
Stellar phenomena
Unexplained phenomena
Unsolved problems in astronomy